Micromyzus niger, is an aphid in the superfamily Aphidoidea in the order Hemiptera. It is a true bug and sucks sap from plants.

References 

 http://aphid.speciesfile.org/Common/basic/Taxa.aspx?TaxonNameID=1166848
 http://animaldiversity.org/accounts/Micromyzus_niger/classification/
 http://www.pherobase.com/database/invasive-species/species-Micromyzus-niger.php
 https://www.gbif.org/species/2071497

Agricultural pest insects
Hemiptera of Africa
Macrosiphini